Hooray for Love is a 1935 American musical comedy film directed by Walter Lang from a screenplay by Lawrence Hazard and Ray Harris, which was based on an unpublished story by Marc Lachmann titled The Show Must Go On.  Starring Ann Sothern and Gene Raymond, they were supported by Bill Robinson, Fats Waller, Maria Gambarelli, Thurston Hall, and Pert Kelton; the film was released by RKO on June 14, 1935, with music by Jimmy McHugh and lyrics by Dorothy Fields. The film's musical director was Alberto Colombo.

References

1935 musical comedy films
American musical comedy films
Films directed by Walter Lang
American black-and-white films
1935 films
RKO Pictures films
1930s American films